The Battle of Caribou was a minor and ultimately bloodless skirmish between U.S. and British (Canadian) armed lumberjacks during the Aroostook War. It added to the growing tensions between the respective governments and encouraged the mobilization of local militias to the area, which nearly sparked an armed conflict.

Background
The area that would become Caribou, Maine was valued for logging, and tensions over which government owned the territory in the vicinity of the Aroostook River flared during the winter of 1838–39. Lumberjacks from both Maine and New Brunswick each wished to harvest wood to the exclusion of their competitors from across the border, and by December 1838, competition coupled with fierce national pride led both sides to carry weapons for their own protection.

The conflict
On December 29, 1838, New Brunswick lumberjacks were spotted felling trees on the estate that had formerly belonged to First Barbary War hero William Eaton. Eaton family members contacted American lumberjacks and other irregulars in the area, and an informal guard was deployed. On New Year's Eve, the New Brunswick woodcutters returned, and were promptly ordered to leave by the Eaton guard. Shouting began, and both sides drew firearms and prepared to fire. As this was occurring, however, a group of three Canadian lumberjacks were unexpectedly attacked by a black bear defending a small nearby cub. Though black bears are native to the area, they typically hibernate by that time of year, confusing the experienced outdoorsmen. The lumberjacks were able to shoot and kill the bear, but not before two of them suffered injuries. The Americans, assuming the shots were directed at them, fired several shots in retaliation. Though none of the Canadians were actually hit by fire, this coupled with the bear attack caused them to withdraw from the area.

Aftermath
News of the encounter quickly spread to both sides. In Maine, Governor John Fairfield ordered the local militia to the site to arrest the "unruly wood thieves" in February 1839. The Canadian lumbermen responded by seizing the Maine Land Agent, and an international incident was sparked. Tensions remained high, with several arrests on both sides, until the Webster-Ashburton Treaty signed August 9, 1842, finally settled the issue.

References

Canada–United States border disputes
Battles and conflicts without fatalities
Aroostook County, Maine
History of Maine
1838 in Maine
Caribou, Maine